Dice: Undisputed is an American reality show on VH1. The show stars Andrew 'Dice' Clay who was a popular comedian in the late 1980s and early 1990s. It follows Clay as he struggles to recapture his past popularity while dealing with his fiancée and two sons. The series premiered on March 4, 2007, and lasted only seven episodes. It was produced by Jeff Kuntz.

The working title for the show was Andrew Dice Clay: Structured Chaos.

Episode listing
The episodes were:
 2007-03-04 — Unfinished Business
 2007-03-04 — The Road Trip- Miami Dice Dice visits Miami, Florida, but a booking mix-up costs him his dignity at a comedy club.
 2007-03-11 — Dice Back on T.V. -- It's Showtime? Dice gets into an argument on the Wendy Williams Show.
 2007-03-18 — The Dice Image - Hair Today, Gone Tomorrow Dice contemplates getting a hair transplant
 2007-03-25 — The Album Recording
 2007-04-01 — The Book Episode

External links
 Dice: Undisputed official site
 

VH1 original programming
2000s American reality television series
2007 American television series debuts
English-language television shows
2007 American television series endings